To play the white man is an idiom which is used in parts of Great Britain and it means that someone is attempting to be decent and trustworthy in his or her actions. The phrase is commonly used by natives of the Yorkshire and the Humber region. 

A similar expression, which originated in the Southern United States in the 20th century, is that's mighty white of you and variations of it, and they mean "thank you for being fair." Because of its racist connotations, since the mid-to-late 20th century, it has mostly been used ironically when it has been used at all.

In film lore, the phrase that's mighty white of you was used in the film After the Thin Man (1936) by the character Nick Charles as said to the character Dancer, the night club host, who stated that he would pay for all the drinks at Nick's table.  A year later in another William Powell / Myrna Loy film Double Wedding (1937), the phrase is used by the character Mrs. Bly. It's also used in other classic-era films like Whistling in Brooklyn (1943) by the character Wally Benton, Western Union (1941) by the character Vance Shaw, and The Miracle of Morgan’s Creek (1944) by the character Constable Edmund Kockenlocker. It is also used by Clint Eastwood as Inspector Harry Callaghan in the 1976 film The Enforcer, and by Sean Penn's character, Mr. Wasey, in the 1986 movie, Shanghai Surprise. It is used as a typical 1937 Southern expression in the film O Brother Where Art Thou (2000)

See also

 Speak White
 "The White Man's Burden"

References

External links

Google Books Ngram Viewer

English-language idioms
Stereotypes of white men
Politics and race
White culture in the United Kingdom
Yorkshire and the Humber